The beach soccer tournaments at the 2019 World Beach Games, the inaugural edition of the Games, were held from 11 to 16 October 2019 in Doha, Qatar and organised by the Association of National Olympic Committees (ANOC). The matches were hosted on the Katara Beach at two venues which comprised the Beach Soccer Arena.

Two events took place: the men's tournament and the women's tournament. A total of 24 teams participated (16 in the men's competition and eight in the women's). The men's squads could consist of up to 12 players and the women's squads, 10 players, meaning a total of 272 athletes were expected to take part.

Brazil claimed the men's title whilst Spain were the winners of the women's category.

Competition schedule
The tournament began one day before the opening ceremony with medal-deciding matches taking place exclusively on 16 October.

Qualification
Each National Olympic Committee (NOC) was allowed to enter one men's team and one women's team into the competition. In order to play at the Games, these teams needed to qualify.

The six continental confederations of FIFA were each allocated a certain amount of berths at the Games; qualification events were organised for teams to compete against other members of their own confederation to try and earn one of their continent's spots at the Games. ANOC delegated the responsibility of organising qualification to Beach Soccer Worldwide (BSWW). Originally, qualification tournaments were planned for all confederations, however, for some, these qualification events were ultimately not realised – instead, their teams which occupied the highest positions in the BSWW World Ranking were granted qualification.

The host country qualifies automatically. When San Diego relinquished the hosting rights to Doha, the United States was stripped of its entitlement to automatic qualification for its men's and women's teams. New hosts, Qatar, declined to enter any teams, leaving the berths reserved for the host nations unfilled; consequently, these vacant berths were redistributed accordingly.

Men's qualification

a. Tahiti are the highest ranked team from the OFC. However, they are ineligible to enter since French Polynesia is not a member of ANOC. Therefore, the berth has been given to the OFC's next highest ranked team that is a member.

Women's qualification

b. With the exception of UEFA, all confederations were originally allocated one berth each. However, neither the Asian Football Confederation (AFC) nor Oceania Football Confederation (OFC) ultimately entered any teams (China were due to enter a team as the AFC representative but withdrew). Therefore, these two vacant berths were redistributed, with CONMEBOL and CONCACAF each receiving one extra berth.
c. Competed in qualification as England. England does not have an independent NOC and is instead represented by Great Britain at Olympic events.

Participating NOCs
A total of 19 National Olympic Committees (NOCs), as per the outcome of qualification events, participated (the number of participating athletes of each NOC are shown in parentheses).

Men's competition

Women's competition

Medal summary

Medal table

Medalists

See also
2019 FIFA Beach Soccer World Cup
Beach soccer at the 2019 European Games

Notes

References

External links
Beach Soccer, at ANOC World Beach Games Qatar (official website)
World Beach Games 2019, at Beach Soccer Worldwide
World Beach Games 2019, at Beach Soccer Russia (in Russian)
Results book

 
World Beach Games
Beach soccer
2019
2019